Metabonellia is a genus of marine spoon worms in the family Bonelliidae. It is a monotypic genus and Metabonellia haswelli is the only species. It is commonly known as the green spoon worm and is found in shallow waters around Australia.

Description
The proboscis has a ciliated groove on the underside along which food particles are passed to the mouth. Behind the mouth, and close to the nephridium, which is raised on a protuberance, are two chetae (bristles), the bases of which are buried in the muscle. The body wall has transverse rows of papillae with flattened tops. The colour of the trunk is a dark, greyish-green, the proboscis is rather paler, and the edges of the forked tip are whitish. In life, the shape and dimensions of the worm are difficult to ascertain because it is constantly wriggling about. The ovarian tissue is situated alongside the ventral blood vessel and the nephridium consists of several interconnecting sacs.

It has a nephridium, a gonad and a rudimentary gut, but no chetae. The males live inside one of the sacs of the female's nephridium, where the eggs are also stored, and obtains its nutrition from the fluid in which it is immersed.

Distribution and habitat
Metabonellia haswelli is found in shallow water around the coast of  Australia and Tasmania. Known locations include Port Jackson in New South Wales, Boat Harbour Beach in Tasmania, Flinders, Victoria and Point Lonsdale, Victoria. Typical habitat is on sand under rocks, in gullies, and on reefs.

Ecology
This worm immerses itself in the sediment or hides its trunk under a rock, extending its proboscis with its two-pronged tip flattened over the substrate. It is a deposit feeder, and any food particles that land on the proboscis are channelled towards the mouth.

References

Echiurans
Animals described in 1920
Monotypic animal genera